Brighter Wounds is the fifth studio album by Son Lux. It was released through City Slang on February 9, 2018. Music videos were created for "Slowly", "All Directions", and "The Fool You Need".

Critical reception
At Metacritic, which assigns a weighted average score out of 100 to reviews from mainstream critics, the album received an average score of 77 based on 11 reviews. This indicated that it garnered "generally favorable reviews".

Track listing

Personnel
Credits adapted from liner notes.

Son Lux
 Ryan Lott – performance, production, arrangement
 Rafiq Bhatia – performance, production, arrangement
 Ian Chang – performance, production, arrangement

Additional musicians
 Starr Busby – vocals 
 Kate Davis – vocals 
 Casey Dienel – vocals 
 Nina Moffitt – vocals 
 Kristin Slipp – vocals 
 Vuyo Sotashe – vocals 
 DM Stith – vocals 
 Vanessa Upson – vocals 
 Hideaki Aomori – clarinet , flute , saxophone 
 Hajnal Pivnick – violin 
 Rob Moose – violin , viola 
 C.J. Camerieri – trumpet , horn 
 Jackson Hill – bass guitar 
 Arrington de Dionyso – clarinet , flute 
 Indianapolis Children's Choir – vocals 
 Dave Douglas – trumpet 
 Trina Basu – violin 
 Arun Ramamurthy – violin 
 Anjna Swaminathan – violin 
 Nadia Sirota – viola 
 Alex Sopp – flute 

Technical personnel
 Ryan Lott – string arrangement , horn arrangement , mixing 
 Rob Moose – string arrangement 
 C.J. Camerieri – horn arrangement 
 Chris Tabron – mixing 
 Dave Kutch – mastering

Charts

References

External links
 

2018 albums
Son Lux albums
City Slang albums